Mahatma Gandhi Memorial may refer to:

 Mahatma Gandhi Memorial (Milwaukee), 2002
 Mahatma Gandhi Memorial (Washington, D.C.), 2000